Pecan Bayou may refer to:

Pecan Bayou (Colorado River tributary), located in west-central Texas
Pecan Bayou (Red River tributary), located in northeastern Texas